Hoejin (Hoejin-myeon) is a township in Jangheung County,  South Jeolla Province, South Korea.

History 

During the age of Baekje, the area was named Masaryang-hyeon(馬斯良縣). When it came under the rule of Silla, King Gyeongdeok changed its name to Daero(代勞) and placed it under Boseong County. In 940 (Taejo of Goryeo 23), it was renamed as Hoeryung and placed under Jangheungdohobu. Under the rule of Josun, it continued to be called Hoeryung.
 1914 Administered by Daedeok
 1980 Gained the status of Eup
 1986 Separated as Hoejin-myeon

Administrative divisions

 Daeri
 Deoksanri
 Shinsangri
 Jinmokri
 Hoejinri

Transportation 

 Noryeok Port

References 

Jangheung County